RABS or RABs may refer to:

 Restricted-access barrier system
 Rapid Action Boat Squadron
 Redfern All Blacks, an Australian rugby league club
 "Rabs", nickname of Ray Warren